The 2018 London municipal election was a municipal election that occurred on October 22, 2018, to elect the Mayor of London, London City Council and the Thames Valley District School Board, London District Catholic School Board, Conseil scolaire catholique Providence and Conseil scolaire Viamonde. The election was held on the same day as elections in every other municipality in Ontario.

As per the Ontario Municipal Elections Act, 1996, nomination papers for candidates for municipal and school board elections could be filed from May 1, 2018, at which time the campaign period began.

For the first time since Calgary's last use in 1971, London used ranked ballots to elect members of council, the mayor and city councillors. 

The major issues facing candidates in this election included Bus Rapid Transit, safe injection sites, affordable rent and social housing stock as well as city unemployment rates.

The use of Instant-runoff voting means (theoretically) that to be elected an aldermanic candidate had to have the majority of the ward vote. In the mayor's case the successful candidate needed to have a majority of the city vote. Where no candidate had majority in first preferences, votes transfers were used to assemble a majority behind one of them. London's rule that only two back-up preferences could be marked meant that in a few of the contests many votes had to be set aside as they had been transferred twice and still had not gone to a candidate with a chance to be elected. Although a majority is required to be elected, that could be a majority of votes still in play. Due to the number of votes being deemed invalid or becoming exhausted, in a few cases the majority accumulated by the winning candidate was less than a majority of valid votes or less than a majority of votes cast. 

Holder, the winning mayoral candidate, was elected in the end with 44,373 votes when 48,320 was a majority of valid votes that were cast.

In Ward 5, Cassidy won with 3922 votes, 44 percent of votes cast.

In Ward 8, Lehman won with 3058 votes, 39 percent of votes cast.

In Ward 12, Peloza won with 3139 votes, 48 percent of votes cast.

Ward 13, Kayabaga won with 2325 votes, 41 percent of votes cast.

Ward 14, Hillier won with 2522 votes, 48 percent of votes cast.

The amount of support recorded for the winning candidate is more than shown in those vote totals. Unusually, in the vote count for the 2018 London election, transfers of votes between candidates continued even after a candidate had accumulated a majority of votes still in play and had been declared the winner. In the mayoral contest for example, the winner (Holder) was determined in the 13th round so there was no need for a 14th round where Holder apparently is recorded as accumulating 100 percent of the votes. 

That the winner in nine out of 15 of the contests held in London in 2018 was elected with a majority of votes cast is noteworthy though. In other municipal elections where first past the post is used, more than half the winners are elected with just a minority of votes cast. (The 2017 Edmonton municipal election is an example where this happened.)

Perhaps in part due to the large number of "exhausted" votes, the leader in the first count won in the end in all the contests in this election. There were no "turn-overs" caused by the front-runner not having the most overall support.

Although ranked ballots were expected to increase the civility of the election, it failed to prevent the creation of two negative websites targeting former city councillor, Virginia Ridley (ward 10), and city councillor, Maureen Cassidy (ward 5).  The controversy has since triggered an OPP investigation into the behaviour of several organizations and candidates in the 2018 municipal election.

Mayor
The mayoralty was an open seat, as incumbent mayor Matt Brown was not running for re-election.

City Council

*Withdrew in September 2018

School Board Trustee 
TVDSB Wards 7, 8, 9, 10, 13

Elected: Jake Skinner, Joyce Bennett

TVDSB Wards 1, 11, 12, 14

Elected: Lori-Ann Pizzolato, Sherry Polhill

TVDSB Wards 2, 3, 4, 5, 6

Elected: Peter Cuddy, Corrine Rahman

LDCSB Wards 5, 6, 7

Elected: Gabe Pizzuti

LDCSB Wards 11, 12, 13

Elected: John Jevnikar

LDCSB Wards 1, 14

Elected: Pedro Almeida

LDCSB Wards 2, 3, 4

Elected: Sandra Cruz

LDCSB Wards 8, 9, 10

Elected: Linda Steel

References

London
Municipal elections in London, Ontario